Saint Finian the Leper was an early Irish saint credited by some sources with founding a church and monastery at Innisfallen in Killarney.

Life

Saint Finian was a disciple of St. Columba. He was a strict Irish abbot, whose monks followed a vegetarian diet. For a period of time, he stayed in Clonmore, later becoming the abbot of Swords Abbey near Dublin. He may have returned to Clonmore in his later years, and was called Lobhar, "The Leper". Following the custom, he acquired the name when he contracted leprosy from a young boy, whom he had cured of the disease. A conflicting source, however, says that he only cured the boy and did not contract leprosy himself.  His feast day is 16 March.

Notes

References

Sources

6th-century Christian saints
Medieval Irish saints
560 deaths